Tariro Mnangagwa (born 1986) is a Zimbabwean film producer, actress and conservationist. She is known for her role in the 2020 film Gonarezhou The Movie. Her producing credits include Gonarezhou The Movie [2020] and The Story of Nehanda. [2021], having starred in both movies as well. She is the youngest daughter of current Zimbabwean president Emmerson Mnangagwa and his first wife Jayne Matarise.

Early life
Mnangagwa was born in Harare to President Emmerson Mnangagwa and Jayne Matarise, who died on 31 January 2002 of cervical cancer. Mnangagwa has five older siblings: Farai, Tasiwa, Vimbayi, Tapiwa, and Emmerson Tanaka. She also has three half-siblings from her father's second marriage. Mnangagwa obtained a Diploma in Professional Photography at Cape Town's CityVarsity. She also graduated with an Honours in Sport Management at the Cape Peninsula University of Technology.

Career
After returning to Zimbabwe, Mnangagwa joined with Akashinga, an all-female anti-poaching ranger unit. Then she became a member an all-female anti-poaching combat unit called the International Anti-Poaching Foundation.

Soon after that, she was invited to play in the film Gonarezhou the co-producer of the film, Sydney Taivavashe. The film is produced in conjunction with the Zimbabwe Parks and Wildlife Management Authority. In the film Tariro played the role 'Sergeant Onai' as well as produced the film.

Filmography

References

External links
 
 Litmus test for filmmakers’ creativity
 ED’s daughter stars in award winning anti-poaching film

Living people
21st-century Zimbabwean actresses
Cape Peninsula University of Technology alumni
1986 births
Zimbabwean film actresses